Iberodes is a genus of flowering plants in the family Boraginaceae native to southwest Europe. The whiteflower navelwort is part of this genus. Most specimens are from the Iberian Peninsula. The genus was previously thought to be part of Omphalodes, and in 2016 was moved to its own. Iberodes kuzinskyana was assessed as Vulnerable in 2010 and is now assessed as Critically endangered by the Portuguese Botanical Society.

Systematics
The recently added genus comprises about 5 species and 2 subspecies:

Iberodes brassicifolia (Lag.) Serrano, R. Carbajal & S. Ortiz
Iberodes commutata (G. López) Serrano, R. Carbajal & S. Ortiz
Iberodes kuzinskyana (Willk.) Serrano, R. Carbajal & S. Ortiz
Iberodes linifolia (L.) Serrano, R. Carbajal & S. Ortiz, the Whiteflower navelwort
Iberodes littoralis (Lehm.) Serrano, R. Carbajal & S. Ortiz
Iberodes littoralis subsp. littoralis
Iberodes littoralis subsp. gallaecica (Laínz) Serrano, R. Carbajal & S. Ortiz

References

Flora of Southwestern Europe
Boraginaceae
Boraginaceae genera